Willy Tänzer (12 December 1889 – 30 November 1949) was a German international footballer who played for Berliner SC.

References

External links
 

1889 births
1949 deaths
BFC Germania 1888 players
Association football defenders
German footballers
Germany international footballers
Berliner SC players